Fosse is a commune in the Pyrénées-Orientales department in southern France.

Geography 
Fosse is located in the canton of La Vallée de l'Agly and in the arrondissement of Perpignan.

Government and politics

Mayors

Population

See also
Communes of the Pyrénées-Orientales department

References

Communes of Pyrénées-Orientales
Fenouillèdes